Gary Spencer Leeman (born February 19, 1964) is a Canadian former professional ice hockey player in the NHL. In 1990, he became the second Toronto Maple Leaf player ever to score 50 goals or more in a single NHL season, after Rick Vaive did it in 1981-82.

Playing career
As a youth, Leeman played in the 1977 Quebec International Pee-Wee Hockey Tournament with a minor ice hockey team from Wexford, Toronto.

Leeman played for the Notre Dame Hounds Junior A team in Wilcox, Saskatchewan and was a standout defenceman for two seasons with the WHL's Regina Pats, where he was voted the league's Top Defenceman and a First Team All-Star.

Leeman was drafted 24th overall by the Toronto Maple Leafs in the 1982 NHL Entry Draft as a defenceman, and returned to junior for a season, where he scored 86 points in 63 games.

He also represented Canada at the World Junior Championships twice, in Leningrad and in Sweden.

Leeman converted to a winger in the NHL. He was best known as a speedy, gritty scoring machine and had a 50-goal season to his credit for the Maple Leafs. He formed the "Hound Line" along with Wendel Clark and Russ Courtnall while helping the Leafs come within a game of the semi-finals. Starting in 1986–87, Leeman was a top goal scorer with Toronto and had four straight 20-goal seasons.

After nearly nine seasons in Toronto, Leeman was the key player sent to the Calgary Flames in the January 2, 1992 blockbuster trade that brought Doug Gilmour to Toronto. To date, the ten-player deal is the largest in NHL history and, looking back, is seen as lopsided in favour of Toronto.

On January 28, 1993, Leeman was traded from the Flames to the Montreal Canadiens in exchange for Brian Skrudland. He won a Stanley Cup in Montreal in that season. He later played for the Vancouver Canucks and the St. Louis Blues. He played a total of 667 regular season games in the NHL, scoring 199 goals and 267 assists for 466 points.

Leeman finished his career in Germany's Deutsche Eishockey Liga for the Hannover Scorpions. He retired in 1999.

Awards and achievements
1983 — WHL First All-Star Team 
1993 — Stanley Cup championship  (Montreal)
1989 — Played in NHL All Star Game  (Toronto)

Career statistics

Regular season and playoffs

International

References

External links

1964 births
Living people
Calgary Flames players
Canadian ice hockey right wingers
Fredericton Canadiens players
Hannover Scorpions players
Montreal Canadiens players
National Hockey League All-Stars
Regina Pats players
St. Catharines Saints players
St. Louis Blues players
Ice hockey people from Toronto
Stanley Cup champions
Toronto Maple Leafs draft picks
Toronto Maple Leafs players
Utah Grizzlies (IHL) players
Vancouver Canucks players
Worcester IceCats players
Canadian expatriate ice hockey players in Germany
Canadian expatriate ice hockey players in the United States